During 2012, tropical cyclones formed within seven different tropical cyclone basins, located within various parts of the Atlantic, Pacific and Indian Oceans. During the year, a total of 128 tropical cyclones had formed this year to date. 85 tropical cyclones had been named by either a Regional Specialized Meteorological Center (RSMC) or a Tropical Cyclone Warning Center (TCWC). 

The most active basin in the year was the Western Pacific, which documented 25 named systems, while the North Atlantic saw its fourth-most-active season on record, tied with 1887, 1995, 2010, and 2011. Conversely, the Eastern Pacific hurricane season experienced an average number of cyclones reaching tropical storm intensity, numbering 17 respectively. The least-active basin of the year was the North Indian Ocean, which had a late start with its first system forming in October. Activity across the southern hemisphere's three basins—South-West Indian, Australian, and South Pacific—was spread evenly, with each region recording seven named storms apiece. So far, twenty-four Category 3 tropical cyclones formed, including three Category 5 tropical cyclones in the year.

The strongest tropical cyclone was Typhoon Sanba, which strengthened to a minimum barometric pressure of 900 mbar (hPa; 26.58 inHg) before striking South Korea. The costliest tropical cyclone of the year was Hurricane Sandy, which caused $68.7 billion (2012 USD) in damages after striking the Caribbean and United States. The deadliest tropical cyclone of the year was Typhoon Bopha which caused widespread destruction on Mindanao, leaving thousands of people homeless and killing 1,901 people.

Global atmospheric and hydrological conditions
The Atlantic Ocean began an organization favorable to the sea surface temperatures, while the Eastern and Central Pacific Ocean began on unfavorable conditions due to dissipation of the 2010–12 La Niña event in April 2012. During the month of May to November along the Pacific hurricane season they a favorable organization began due to the sea surface temperatures and the formation of El Niño–Southern Oscillation.

Summary

Nineteen tropical cyclones formed in the Atlantic hurricane season, the third-most active in history with previous 1887, 1995, 2010 and 2011 seasons. On East Pacific and Central Pacific, a total of 17 named storms formed during the season.

Systems
A total of 132 systems formed globally in the year with 52 of them causing significant damage, deaths, and/or setting records for their basin.

January

January was the most active month of the year with 21 tropical cyclones being named. However, only six were named by specific tropical cyclone naming agencies. Intense Tropical Cyclone Funso became the strongest South-West tropical cyclone on record before striking in Mozambique and Malawi.

February

A total of nine tropical systems of all intensities were monitored during February 2012, of which five developed further and were named by the various warning centres. Intense Tropical Cyclone Giovanna was a powerful tropical cyclone that affected Madagascar. Giovanna is still blamed for 33 deaths along the Madagascar coast, and it is the first intense tropical cyclone to impact Madagascar, since Cyclone Bingiza in February 2011.

March

A total of twelve tropical systems of all intensities were monitored during March 2012, of which four developed further and were named by the various warning centres. Cyclone Lua affected a sparsely populated region of Western Australia.

April

A total of 4 tropical cyclones formed during this month, making this month the least active of 2012. None of these tropical cyclones were tropical storm strength or higher, thus making Tropical Cyclone Daphne, which was formed in March as the strongest tropical cyclone of this month.

May

June

July
July was inactive with only seven tropical cyclones being named, with all of them being named.

August

September

October

November

December

Global effects

Notes

1 Only systems that formed either on or after January 1, 2012 are counted in the seasonal totals.
2 Only systems that formed either before or on December 31, 2012 are counted in the seasonal totals.3 The wind speeds for this tropical cyclone/basin are based on the IMD Scale which uses 3-minute sustained winds.
4 The wind speeds for this tropical cyclone/basin are based on the Saffir Simpson Scale which uses 1-minute sustained winds.5The wind speeds for this tropical cyclone are based on Météo-France which uses gust winds.

See also

 Tropical cyclones by year
 List of earthquakes in 2012
 Tornadoes of 2012

References

External links 

Regional Specialized Meteorological Centers
 US National Hurricane Center – North Atlantic, Eastern Pacific
 Central Pacific Hurricane Center – Central Pacific
 Japan Meteorological Agency – NW Pacific
 India Meteorological Department – Bay of Bengal and the Arabian Sea
 Météo-France – La Reunion – South Indian Ocean from 30°E to 90°E
 Fiji Meteorological Service – South Pacific west of 160°E, north of 25° S

Tropical Cyclone Warning Centers
 Meteorology, Climatology, and Geophysical Agency of Indonesia – South Indian Ocean from 90°E to 141°E, generally north of 10°S
 Australian Bureau of Meteorology (TCWC's Perth, Darwin & Brisbane) – South Indian Ocean & South Pacific Ocean from 90°E to 160°E, generally south of 10°S
 Papua New Guinea National Weather Service – South Pacific Ocean from 141°E to 160°E, generally north of 10°S
 Meteorological Service of New Zealand Limited – South Pacific west of 160°E, south of 25°S

Tropical cyclones by year
2012 Atlantic hurricane season
2012 Pacific hurricane season
2012 Pacific typhoon season
2012 North Indian Ocean cyclone season
2011–12 Australian region cyclone season
2012–13 Australian region cyclone season
2011–12 South Pacific cyclone season
2012–13 South Pacific cyclone season
2011–12 South-West Indian Ocean cyclone season
2012–13 South-West Indian Ocean cyclone season
2012-related lists